Vive la Canadienne was the anthem of French Canadians in Quebec before it was replaced by O Canada. According to Ernest Gagnon, it was based on an old French tune, Par derrièr' chez mon père.

It is the quick march of the Royal 22nd Regiment.

Lyrics

French lyrics
Vive la canadienne, vole mon coeur vole, vole, vole <br/ >
Vive la canadienne et ses jolis yeux doux <br/ >
Et ses jolis yeux doux doux doux, et ses jolis yeux doux (bis) <br/ >
Vive la canadienne et ses jolis yeux doux <br/ >

Elle est vraiment chrétienne, vole mon coeur vole, vole, vole <br/ >
Elle est vraiment chrétienne, trésor de son époux <br/ >
Trésor de son époux pou pou, trésor de son époux palipatouti! <br/ >
Elle est vraiment chrétienne, trésor de son époux <br/ >

Elle rayonne et brille vole mon coeur vole, vole, vole <br/ >
Elle rayonne et brille, avec ou sans bijoux <br/ >
Avec ou sans bijoux jou jou, avec ou sans bijou mouah! <br/ >
Elle rayonne et brille avec ou sans bijoux <br/ >

C'est à qui la marie, vole mon coeur vole, vole, vole <br/ >
C'est à qui la marie, les garçons en sont fous <br/ >
Les garçons en sont fous fou fou, les garçons en sont fous (bis) <br/ >
C'est à qui la marie, les garçons en sont fous <br/ >

Que d'enfants elle donne, vole mon coeur vole, vole, vole <br/ >
Que d'enfants elle donne, à son joyeux époux <br/ >
À son joyeux époux pou pou, à son joyeux époux mouah! <br/ >
Que d'enfants elle donne à son joyeux époux <br/ >

Jusqu'à l'heure dernière, vole mon coeur vole, vole, vole <br/ >
Jusqu'à l'heure dernière, sa vie est toute à nous <br/ >
Sa vie est toute à nous nou nou, sa vie est toute à nous (bis) <br/ >
Jusqu'à l'heure dernière sa vie est toute à nous. <br/ >

English translation
Long live the Canadian, steal my heart fly, fly, fly, <br/ >
Long live the Canadian and her pretty sweet eyes <br/ >
And her sweet soft sweet eyes, and her sweet eyes (twice) <br/ >
Long live the Canadian and her sweet eyes <br/ >

She's really Christian, steals my heart flies, flies, flies <br/ >
She is truly Christian, the treasure of her husband <br/ >
Treasure of her husband husband, treasure of her husband palipatouti! <br/ >
She is truly Christian, treasure of her husband <br/ >

She shines and shines flies my heart flies, flies, flies <br/ >
She shines and shines, with or without jewels <br/ >
With or without jewels jou jou, with or without jewels mouah! <br/ >
She shines and shines with or without jewels <br/ >

Who's the bride, steals my heart steals, steals, steals <br/ >
Who's the bride, the boys are crazy for her <br/ >
The boys are crazy crazy crazy, the boys are crazy (twice) <br/ >
Who's the bride, the boys are crazy for her <br/ >

What children she gives, steals my heart flies, flies, flies <br/ >
What children she gives, to her happy husband <br/ >
To her happy husband husband, to her happy husband mouah! <br/ >
How many children she gives to her happy husband <br/ >

Until the last hour, steals my heart flies, flies, flies <br/ >
Until the last hour, her life is all ours <br/ >
Her life is all ours ours ours, her life is all ours (twice) <br/ >
Until the last hour her life is all ours. <br/ >

In popular culture
 It is used as the theme for the Canadian civilization in Civilization VI: Gathering Storm along with O Canada and The Crooked Stovepipe.

References

National symbols of Canada
Canadian patriotic songs
Quebec songs
Canadian military marches